Tochara  is a species of moth of the family Erebidae first described by Jeremy Daniel Holloway in 1976. It is found in Borneo.

The male has a wingspan of about 18 mm and the female of 20 mm.

References

Moths of Borneo
Tochara
Moths described in 1976